List of Catch-22 characters
 Henry Osborne Havemeyer (1847–1907), American businessman
 Theodore Havermeyer Northrup (1866–1919), musician